Class discrimination, also known as classism, is prejudice or discrimination on the basis of social class. It includes individual attitudes, behaviors, systems of policies and practices that are set up to benefit the upper class at the expense of the lower class.
Social class refers to the grouping of individuals in a hierarchy based on wealth, income, education, occupation, and social network.

History 
Class structures existed in a simplified form in pre-agricultural societies, but it has evolved into a more complex and established structure following the establishment of permanent agriculture-based civilizations with a food surplus. 

Classism started to be practiced around the 18th century. Segregation into classes was accomplished through observable traits (such as race or profession) that were accorded varying status and privileges. Feudal classification systems might include merchant, serf, peasant, warrior, priestly, and noble classes. Rankings were far from invariant with the merchant class in Europe outranking the peasantry, while merchants were explicitly inferior to peasants during the Tokugawa Shogunate in Japan. Modern classism, with less rigid class structures, is harder to identify. In a professional association posting, psychologist Thomas Fuller-Rowell states, "Experiences of [class] discrimination are often subtle rather than blatant, and the exact reason for unfair treatment is often not clear to the victim."

Intersections with other systems of oppression
Socioeconomic, racial/ethnic and gender inequalities in academic achievement have been widely reported in the United States, but how these three axes of inequality intersect to determine academic and non-academic outcomes among school-aged children is not well understood.

Institutional versus personal classism 
The term classism can refer to personal prejudice against lower classes as well as to institutional classism, just as the term racism can refer either strictly to personal prejudice or to institutional racism. The latter has been defined as "the ways in which conscious or unconscious classism is manifest in the various institutions of our society".

As with social classes, the difference in social status between people determines how they behave toward each other and the prejudices they likely hold toward each other. People of higher status do not generally mix with lower-status people and often are able to control other people's activities by influencing laws and social standards.

The term "interpersonal" is sometimes used in place of "personal" as in "institutional classism (versus) interpersonal classism" and terms such as "attitude" or "attitudinal" may replace "interpersonal" as contrasting with institutional classism as in the Association of Magazine Media's definition of classism as "any attitude or institutional practice which subordinates people due to income, occupation, education and/or their economic condition".

Classism is also sometimes broken down into more than two categories as in "personal, institutional and cultural" classism. It is common knowledge in sociolinguistics that meta-social language abounds in lower registers, thus the slang for various classes or racial castes.

In the UAE, Western workers and local nationals are given better treatment or are preferred.

Media representation 
Class discrimination can be seen in many different forms of media such as television shows, films and social media. Classism is also systemic, and its implications can go unnoticed in the media that is consumed by society. Class discrimination in the media displays the knowledge of what people feel and think about classism. When seeing class discrimination in films and television shows, people are influenced and believe that is how things are in real life, for whatever class is being displayed. Children can be exposed to class discrimination through movies, with a large pool of high-grossing G-rated movies portraying classism in various contexts. Children may develop biases at a young age that shape their beliefs throughout their lifetime, which would demonstrate the issues with class discrimination being prevalent in the media. Media is a big influence on the world today, with that something such as classism is can be seen in many different lights. Media plays an important role in how certain groups of people are perceived, which can make certain biases stronger. Usually, the lower income people are displayed in the media as dirty, lacking education and manners, and homeless. People can use the media to learn more about different social classes or use the media, such as social media to influence others on what they believe. In some cases, people who are in a social class that is portrayed negatively by the media can be affected in school and social life as "teenagers who grew up in poverty reported higher levels of discrimination, and the poorer the teens were, the more they experienced discrimination".

Legislation 
The European Convention on Human Rights, in Article 14, contains protections against social class ("social origin") discrimination.

See also

References

Further reading 
 Bowker, Geoffrey C., and Susan Leigh Star. Sorting Things Out: Classification and Its Consequences. MIT Press, 1999.
  (2016) 39(1) University of New South Wales Law Journal 84. 
 A People's History of the United States by Howard Zinn.
 Hill, Marcia, and Esther Rothblum. Classism and Feminist Therapy: Counting Costs. New York: Haworth Press, 1996.
 hooks, bell. Where we stand: class matters. New York & London: Routledge, 2000.
 Gans, Herbert. The War Against the Poor, 1996.
 Homan, Jacqueline S. Classism For Dimwits. Pennsylvania: Elf Books, 2007/2009.
 Packard, Vance. Status Seekers, 1959.
 Beegle, Donna M. See Poverty - Be the Difference, 2009.
 Leondar-Wright, Betsy.  Class Matters: Cross-Class Alliance Building for Middle-Class Activists: New Society Publishers, 2005.

External links

"People Like Us" at PBS
Class Action

 
Political terminology
Social classes